Sansar is a 1971 Bollywood drama film directed by Dilip Bose. The film stars Navin Nischol, Abhi Bhattacharya, Anupama and Nirupa Roy. 
The music score for this movie was by Chitragupta. Poet Sahir Ludhianvi penned the lyrics for seven songs in the movie. Two of the numbers went on to become very popular : Bas Ab Tarsaana Chhodo (Kishore Kumar and Asha Bhonsle) and Haathon Mein Kitaab Baalon Mein Gulaab (Kishore Kumar)

External links
 

1971 films
1970s Hindi-language films
1971 drama films